Just is a masculine given name. It may refer to:

 Just Fontaine (born 1933), French retired footballer
 Just Høg (1584-1646), Danish politician, landowner and Chancellor of the Realm
 Just Jaeckin (1940–2022), French film director
 Just Spee (born 1965), Dutch football administrator

Masculine given names